Dipterocarpus costatus (Khmer chhë tiël niëng, chhë tiël bangkuëy, niëng daèng krâhâm) is a species of tree in the family Dipterocarpaceae found in the Indochinese and Malay Peninsulas, including Cambodia. The tree is found in "mixed dense deciduous or half-deciduous forest of the plain and in wet dense altitude forest, up to 1200 m, on well drained rich grounds." It grows to a height of 25-40m. In Cambodia the resin is used particularly for the caulking of boats, and the preparation of torches, the wood used for work not exposed to the elements.

References

costatus
Flora of Indo-China
Flora of Laos
Trees of Indo-China